Delio Morollón Estébanez (23 July 1937 – 17 February 1992) was a Spanish footballer who played as a forward.

Honours

Team
Real Madrid
La Liga: 1964–65

Individual
Pichichi Trophy (Segunda División): 1958–59

External links
 
 National team data 
 

1937 births
1992 deaths
Footballers from Madrid
Spanish footballers
Association football forwards
La Liga players
Segunda División players
UD Salamanca players
Real Valladolid players
Real Madrid CF players
CE Sabadell FC footballers
SD Ponferradina players
CD Castellón footballers
Spain under-21 international footballers
Spain international footballers